Michael A. Hammer (born December 26, 1963) is an American diplomat who is serving as the United States Special Envoy for the Horn of Africa as of 2022. A career member of the United States Foreign Service, Hammer previously served as the United States ambassador to Chile from 2014 to 2016 and the United States ambassador to the Democratic Republic of the Congo from 2018 to 2022.

Education 
Born in Washington D.C., Hammer grew up in Latin America, living in Honduras, El Salvador, Colombia, Venezuela, and Brazil. He received a bachelor's degree from Georgetown University's Edmund A. Walsh School of Foreign Service, and master's degrees from The Fletcher School of Law and Diplomacy at Tufts University and the National War College at the National Defense University.

Career
Mike Hammer is a career member of the United States Senior Foreign Service. Hammer joined the Foreign Service in 1988 and has served abroad in Bolivia, Norway, Iceland, and Denmark. In Washington, he has served in the State Department's Operations Center and as Special Assistant to Under Secretary of State for Political Affairs Marc Grossman, where Hammer was responsible for Latin American affairs. From 2012 to 2013, Hammer served as Assistant Secretary of State for Public Affairs. He served as Acting Assistant Secretary from 2011 to 2012.

Hammer served as Special Assistant to the President, Senior Director for Press and Communications, and Spokesman at the National Security Council at the White House from 2009 to 2011. He also previously served at the National Security Council as Deputy Spokesman (from 1999 to 2000) and Director for Andean Affairs (from 2000 to 2001).

On June 21, 2013, President Barack Obama nominated Hammer to be the United States Ambassador to the Republic of Chile. He was confirmed by the United States Senate on March 6, 2014, and sworn in on March 7, 2014.

He was nominated to be the next ambassador to the Democratic Republic of the Congo by President Donald Trump on June 20, 2018, and confirmed by the Senate on September 6, 2018.

On June 1, 2022, U.S Secretary of State Antony J. Blinken announced Mike Hammer as the new Special Envoy for the Horn of Africa under the Biden Administration. Hammer replaced David Satterfield.

Personal life
Hammer is married with three children. He speaks Spanish, French, Portuguese, and Icelandic.

See also
List of current ambassadors of the United States
List of ambassadors appointed by Donald Trump

References

External links

|-

|-

1963 births
Ambassadors of the United States to Chile
Walsh School of Foreign Service alumni
Living people
National War College alumni
The Fletcher School at Tufts University alumni
United States Assistant Secretaries of State
United States National Security Council staffers
Ambassadors of the United States to the Democratic Republic of the Congo
United States Foreign Service personnel
21st-century American diplomats